Nitratine or nitratite, also known as cubic niter (UK: nitre), soda niter or Chile saltpeter (UK: Chile saltpetre), is a mineral, the naturally occurring form of sodium nitrate, NaNO3. Chemically it is the sodium analogue of saltpeter. Nitratine crystallizes in the trigonal system, but rarely occurs as well formed crystals. It is isostructural with calcite. It is quite soft and light with a Mohs hardness of 1.5 to 2 and a specific gravity of 2.24 to 2.29. Its refractive indices are nω=1.587 and nε=1.336.

The typical form is as coatings of white, grey to yellowish brown masses. The rare crystals when found typically have the scalenohedral form of the calcite structure. It is found only as an efflorescence in very dry environments. It is very soluble in water such that it is deliquescent and will absorb water out of the air and turn into a puddle of sodium nitrate solution when exposed to humid air. 

There are nitratine deposits located in arid regions across the world such as in Chile, Mexico, Egypt, Peru, and South Africa. Chile is the only country to sell their deposits commercially as fertilizer. The salt bed that is mined contains more minerals than just nitratine often containing sulfurous minerals as well as Iodine. Around 600,000 tons of nitratine are mined in Chile each year with other products such as Iodine and sodium sulfate mined as well.   

Nitratine was once an important source of nitrates for fertilizer and other chemical uses including fireworks. It has been known since 1845 from occurrences in the Confidence Hills, Southern Death Valley, California and the Atacama Desert, Chile. It is still used in organic farming (where Haber–Bosch ammonia is forbidden) in the US, but prohibited in international organic agriculture.

The Saltpeter War (1480-1510) and the War of the Pacific (1879-1884) were fought over the control of saltpeter deposits.

See also
 Niter
 List of Saltpeter works in Tarapacá and Antofagasta
 Mining in Chile
 Paradas method
 Potassium nitrate
 Nitrogen cycle
 Nitrate

References

External links
 Nitratine page on mindat.org
 Nitratine page on webmineral.com
 Mineral galleries data

Sodium minerals
Nitrate minerals
Saltpeter works
Trigonal minerals
Minerals in space group 167